Dave Moore (born Cedar Rapids, IA, July 5, 1951) is a folksinger, songwriter, and multi-instrumentalist who lives in Iowa City, IA. He is accomplished on the guitar, harmonica, button accordion, pan pipes, and more. He performed regularly on A Prairie Home Companion between 1986 and 2014. His ninth album, Breaking Down to 3, was the subject of an interview-feature on NPR’s All Things Considered,. In 1985, he won a National Endowment for the Arts grant to study Conjunto accordion with Fred Zimmerle in Texas; he had previously "spent the bulk of the '70s traveling through Latin America and the American South and West, soaking in a wide range of musical influences along the way," and studying with folk musicians in San Cristobal de las Casas and Chiapas.

Partial Discography: Albums with Red House Records

Jukejoints and Cantinas (rec. 1984; released 1985, Red House Records) with Paul Cunliffe and Dough Thomson
Over My Shoulder (1990) with Peter Ostroushko, Greg Brown, Radoslav Lorković and others. (named one of the top ten folk albums of 1990 by Pulse Magazine.
Breaking Down to 3 (1999), with Bo Ramsey, David Zollo and more; No Depression called it "a sublime moving tour-de-force. Moore conjures up some heaven-sent intersection of Don Williams, Harlan Howard and Johnny Cash."

As a sideman he has recorded with many musicians, including Greg Brown (folk musician).

References

External links
Red House Records Official Site

1951 births
Living people
People from Cedar Rapids, Iowa
American folk musicians
Red House Records artists
Singer-songwriters from Iowa